This is a list of notable Maltese people including those not born in, or current residents of, Malta; they are Maltese nationals.

Actors
 Valerie Buhagiar (born 1964)
 Joseph Calleia (1897–1975)
 Terry Camilleri (born 1949)
 Charles Clews (1919–2009)
 Madeleine Collinson (1952–2014) – actress, model
 Mary Collinson (born 1952) – actress, model
 Ivan De Battista (born 1977)
 Simone De Battista (born 1977)
 Joseph Gatt (born 1974) actor, model, voice artist
 Anthony J. Mifsud
 Eileen Montesin
 Angelo Muscat (1930–1977)
 Charles Thake (1927–2018)
 Davide Tucci (born 1987) – actor
 Joseph Vassallo (born 1964)

Architects
 Giovanni Attard (c. 1570–1636) architect, military engineer and stone carver
 Giovanni Barbara (1642–1728) architect and military engineer
 Isabelle Barratt-Delia (born 1938) architect
 Andrea Belli (1703–1772) architect and businessman
 Lino Bianco (born 1965) practicing architect and academic
 Giuseppe Bonavia (1821–1885) draughtsman and architect
 Giuseppe Bonici (1707–1779) architect and military engineer
 Antonio Cachia (1739–1813) architect, civil and military engineer and archaeologist
 Domenico Cachia (c. 1690–1761) master builder
 Michele Cachia (1760–1839) architect and military engineer
 Girolamo Cassar (c. 1520 c. 1592) designed many buildings in Valletta
 Vittorio Cassar (c. 1550 c. 1609) military engineer
 Cesar Castellani (died 1905) worked in Guyana
 Tommaso Dingli (1591–1666) designed various churches
 Richard England (born 1937)
 Antonio Falzon (16th century) military engineer, worked in Germany
 Lorenzo Gafà (1638–1703) Baroque architect
 Emanuele Luigi Galizia (1830–1907) designed many public buildings
 Carlo Gimach (1651–1730) architect, engineer and poet
 Roger de Giorgio (1922–2016) architect
 Giorgio Grognet de Vassé (1774–1862) architect and antiquarian
 Joseph G. Huntingford (1926–1994) Modernist architect
 Giuseppe Psaila (1891–1960) Art Nouveau architect
 Giorgio Pullicino (1779–1851) painter and architect
 Giorgio Costantino Schinas (1834–1894) architect and civil engineer
 Andrea Vassallo (1856–1928) eclectic architect
 Gustavo R. Vincenti (1888–1974) architect and developer
 Francesco Zerafa (1679–1758) architect and capomastro

Composers
 Girolamo Abos (1715–1760)
 Francesco Azopardi (1748–1809)
 Charles Camilleri (1931–2008)
 Alessandro Curmi (1801–1857)
 Albert Garzia (born 1977)
 Nicolas Isouard (1775–1818)
 Carmelo Pace (1906–1993) composer; professor of musical theory and harmonics
 Reuben Pace (born 1974)
 Robert Samut (1869–1934) composer of "L-Innu Malti" (the national anthem of Malta); professor of physiology and bacteriology
 Benigno Zerafa (1726–1804)

Filmmakers
 Mario Philip Azzopardi (born 1950) director
 Jon Cassar (born 1958) director; producer
 Rebecca Cremona  director

Military figures
 Juan Bautista Azopardo (1772–1848) founder of the Argentine Navy
 Toni Bajada (16th century) spy during the Great Siege of Malta
 Orlando E. Caruana (1844–1917) fought during the American Civil War
 Clemente Tabone ( 1575–1665) landowner and militia member
 Emmanuele Vitale (1758–1802) general of the Maltese forces in the Siege of Malta (1798–1800)
 Antonio Williams (1825–1908) United States Navy seaman
 Brigadier Martin Xuereb (born 1968) former commander of the Armed Forces of Malta

Musicians (including singers)
 Sebastian Calleja (born 1998) singer; winner OGAE Eurovision Weekend 2016 Berlin, Germany
 Gianluca Bezzina (born 1989) singer; medical doctor
 Nicky Bomba (born 1963) drummer; leads the Australian funk and reggae band Bomba.
 Amber Bondin (born 1991) singer
 Gerard James Borg songwriter
 Kevin Borg (born 1986) singer-songwriter; producer; winner of the Swedish reality-competition talent show Idol 2008
 Joe C. (1974–2000) rapper; of Maltese descent
 Joseph Calleja (born 1978) tenor singer
 Kurt Calleja (born 1989) singer
 Joe Camilleri (born 1948) singer-songwriter; saxophonist
 Pawlu Camilleri (born 1958) harmonica musician
 Capitol K musician
 Lydia Caruana soprano
 Eleanor Cassar (born 1982) singer
 Gaia Cauchi (born 2002) child singer, winner of the Junior Eurovision Song Contest 2013
 Lynn Chircop (born 1980) singer and television presenter
 Miriam Christine (born 1978) singer
 Destiny Chukunyere (born 2002) singer, winner of the Junior Eurovision Song Contest 2015
 Federica Falzon (born 2003) operatic pop singer
 Claudia Faniello (born 1988) singer
 Fabrizio Faniello (born 1981) singer
 Miriam Gauci opera singer
 Natalie Gauci (born 1981) singer
 Ludwig Galea (born 1977) singer
 Robert Galea (born 1981) Christian singer-songwriter
 Stefan Galea (born 1996) singer
 Thea Garrett (born 1992) singer
 Albert Garzia (born 1977) composer and musician
 Lawrence Gray (born 1975) singer
 Joe Grech (born 1934) singer-songwriter
 Martin Grech (born 1983) singer-songwriter
 Enzo Gusman (1947-2021) broadcaster singer-songwriter
 Sarah Harrison (born 1993) singer, DJ, producer, musician
 Hooligan (born 1980) rapper
 Rosa Judge (born 1919) musician
 Oreste Kirkop (1923–1998) opera singer; film actor
 La Barokka singer
 Olivia Lewis (born 1978) singer
 Ira Losco (born 1981) singer-songwriter
 William Mangion (born 1958) singer
 Walter Micallef (born 1955) singer-songwriter
 Renato Micallef (born 1951) pop singer
 Anthony J. Mifsud singer-songwriter
 Sigmund Mifsud trumpeter, CEO Malta Philharmonic Orchestra
 Antoinette Miggiani (born 1937) opera singer
 Morena (born 1984) singer
 Brent Muscat (born 1967) guitarist
 Emma Muscat (born 1999) singer, model (from one of Malta's wealthiest families)
 Muxu (born 1990) singer-songwriter
 Gabriela N (born 1993) singer-songwriter
 Antonio Olivari (born 1980) songwriter and composer
 Claudette Pace (born 1968) singer and politician
 Freddie Portelli (born 1944) singer-songwriter
 Jes Psaila (born 1964) guitarist
 Veronica Rotin (born 2004) child singer
 Roger Scannura flamenco guitarist
 Christabelle (born 1992) singer-songwriter
 Debbie Scerri (born 1969) singer and television presenter
 Chiara Siracusa (born 1976) singer
 Mary Spiteri (born 1947) singer
 Renzo Spiteri percussionist
 Sharleen Spiteri (born 1967) singer-songwriter; guitarist; lead vocalist of the Scottish pop-rock band Texas
 Marc Storace (born 1949) singer of the Swiss hard-rock band Krokus
 Daniel Testa (born 1997) singer, radio and television presenter
 Melissa Tkautz (born 1974) singer
 Glen Vella (born 1983) singer
 Philip Vella
 Julie Zahra (born 1982) singer, member Parliament of Malta
 Aidan Zammit (born 1965) composer, musician and singer

Painters and sculptors

 Vincent Apap (1909–2003) sculptor
 Willie Apap (1918–1970) painter
 Isabelle Borg (1959–2010) painter
 Tony Briffa (artist) (born 1959)
 Gio Nicola Buhagiar (1698–1752) painter
 Giuseppe Calì (1846–1930)  painter
 Antoine Camilleri (1922–2005) painter; teacher; stamp designer
 Gabriel Caruana (1929–2018) artist
 Debbie Caruana Dingli (born 1962) painter
 Edward Caruana Dingli (1876–1950) painter
 Emvin Cremona (1919–1987) painter; stamp designer
 Maria de Dominici (1645–1703) Baroque painter & sculptor
 Vincenzo Dimech (1768–1831) sculptor
 Alessio Erardi (1669–1727) painter
 Pietro Erardi (1644–1727) painter; chaplain
 Stefano Erardi (1630–1716) painter

 Melchiorre Gafà (1636–1667) Baroque sculptor
 Francesco Noletti (1611–1654) Baroque painter
 Andrew Micallef (born 1969) painter and musician
 Amedeo Preziosi (1816–1882) painter
 Alberto Pullicino (1719–1759) painter
 Giorgio Pullicino (1779–1851) painter and architect
 Antonio Sciortino (1879–1947) sculptor
 Pietro Paolo Troisi (1686–1743) sculptor, silversmith, designer, engraver
 Gianni Vella (1885–1977) painter
 Francesco Zahra (1710–1773) painter
 Jean Zaleski (1920–2010) Maltese-American painter
 Carlo Zimech (1696–1766) painter and priest

Poets and writers
 Clare Azzopardi (born 1977)  writer
 Louis Briffa (born 1971)  poet
 Rużar Briffa (1906–1963) poet
 Anton Buttigieg (1912–1983) poet
 Ray Buttigieg (born 1955) composer; poet; producer
 Daphne Caruana Galizia (1964–2017) journalist; writer; activist
 Antoine Cassar (born 1978) poet
 Pietru Caxaro (c. 1400–1485) poet; philosopher
 Francis Ebejer (1925–1993) dramatist; novelist
 Joe Friggieri (born 1946) philosophy professor; poet
 Oliver Friggieri (1947–2020) novelist; poet; minor philosopher
 Carlo Gimach (1651–1730) architect, engineer and poet
 Elizabeth Grech (born 1978)  writer; poet; translator
 Doreen Micallef (1949–2001) poet
 Immanuel Mifsud (born 1967) novelist; poet
 Mary Meilak (1905–1975) poet
 Pierre J. Mejlak (born 1982) short-story writer
 Dun Karm Psaila (1871–1961) poet; lyricist of the national anthem of Malta
 Frans Sammut (1945–2011) novelist, short-story writer, essayist, historian
 Karl Schembri (born 1978) poet; novelist; journalist
 Mario Vella (born 1953) poet; philosopher; economist; political theorist
 Marjanu Vella (1927–1988) poet; writer
 Trevor Żahra (born 1947) novelist, poet and illustrator
 Michael Zammit (born 1954) philosophy professor; poet

Politicians

 George Abela (born 1948) President of Malta (2009–2014)
 Robert Abela (born 1977) Prime Minister of Malta (since 2020)
 Wistin Abela (1933–2014) Deputy Prime Minister of Malta (1981–1983)
 Eddie Fenech Adami (born 1934) Prime Minister of Malta (1987–1996, 1998–2004); President of Malta (2004–2009)
 John Aquilina (born 1950) Australian politician and Maltese diplomat
 Agatha Barbara (1923–2002) government minister; member, Parliament of Malta; President of Malta (1982–1987)
 Claudette Abela Baldacchino (born 1973), journalist, Labour Party politician and Member of the European Parliament
 Leo Brincat Member of the European Court of Auditors
 Paul Boffa (1890–1962) Prime Minister of Malta (1947–1950)
 Joe Borg (born 1952) European Commissioner for Maritime Affairs and Fisheries; European Commissioner for Humanitarian Aid and Civil Protection
 Tonio Borg (born 1957) European Commissioner for Health and Consumer Policy
 George Borg Olivier (1911–1980) Prime Minister of Malta (1950–1955, 1962–1971)
 Francesco Buhagiar (1876–1934) Prime Minister of Malta (1923–1924)
 Simon Busuttil (born 1969) leader, Nationalist Party (2013-2017), Member of European Parliament (2004-2013)
 Anton Buttigieg (1912–1983) President of Malta (1976–1981)
 Arnold Cassola (born 1956) professor of comparative literature; former chairperson, Democratic Alternative
 Joseph Cefai (1921–1996) member, Parliament of Malta (1947–1953); Secretary of Gozo Affairs (until 1981)
 Marie Louise Coleiro Preca (born 1958) President of Malta (since 2014)
 John Dalli (born 1948)  European Commissioner for Health and Consumer Policy (2010–2012)
 Joe Debono Grech (born 1939) member, Parliament of Malta (since 1971)
 Guido de Marco (1931–2010) Deputy Prime Minister of Malta; President of Malta (1999–2004)
 Manwel Dimech (1860–1921) politician; social reformer; philosopher; journalist; writer
 Cyrus Engerer (born 1981) Member of European Parliament (2020-present)
 Giovanni Felice (1899–1977) Minister of Industry and Tourism (1962–1966); Finance Minister of Malta (1966–1971) in the Giorgio Borġ Olivier cabinet
 Joseph Flores (1907–1974) Speaker of the House of Representatives of Malta; judge
 Lawrence Gonzi (born 1953) Prime Minister of Malta (2004–2013)
 Louis Grech (born 1947) Deputy Prime Minister of Malta (since 2013)
 Joseph Howard (1862–1925) Prime Minister of Malta (1921–1923)
 Albert Hyzler (1916–1993) Acting President of Malta (1981–1982)
 Carmel Inguanez diplomat, ambassador 
 Norman Lowell (born 1946) founder and leader, Imperium Europa
 Anthony Mamo (1909–2008) Governor-General of Malta (1971–1974); President of Malta (1974–1976)
 Francesco Masini (1894–1964) founder, Gozo Party; member, Parliament of Malta (1947–1950)
 Sir Ugo Pasquale Mifsud (1889–1942) Prime Minister of Malta (1932–1933)
 Karmenu Mifsud Bonnici (born 1933) Prime Minister of Malta (1984–1987)
 Ugo Mifsud Bonnici (born 1932) government minister; President of Malta (1994–1999)
 Dom Mintoff (1916–2012) Prime Minister of Malta (1955–1958, 1971–1984)
 Enrico Mizzi (1885–1950) Prime Minister of Malta (1950)
 Joseph Muscat (born 1974) Member of the European Parliament (2004–2008); leader, Labour Party (2008–2020), Prime Minister of Malta (2013–2020)
 Alfred Sant (born 1948) Prime Minister of Malta (1996–1998)
 Lorry Sant (1937–1995) government minister
 Carm Lino Spiteri (1932–2008) Nationalist Party politician
 Gerald Strickland (1861–1940) Prime Minister of Malta (1927–1932); Governor of Tasmania; Governor of Western Australia; Governor of New South Wales
 Mabel Strickland, journalist, newspaper proprietor and politician, daughter of the above
 Ċensu Tabone (1913–2012) government minister; President of Malta (1989–1994)
 George William Vella (born 1942) government minister; Deputy Prime Minister of Malta (1996–1998)
 Paul Xuereb (1923–1994) Speaker of the House of Representatives of Malta (1986–1987); Acting President of Malta (1987–1989)

Religious dignitaries
Saint Publius (33–112) – first Bishop of Malta; martyr and saint.
 Joseph De Piro (1877–1933) founder, Missionary Society of St. Paul

 Saint George Preca (1880–1962) canonized saint, Roman Catholic Church; founder, Society of Christian Doctrine
 Donat Spiteri (1922–2011) Biblical scholar; founder and editor, booklet Kliem il-Hajja (English language: The Word of Life)
 Dun Mikiel Xerri (1737–1799) national hero of Malta

Scholars and academics
 Joseph Aquilina (1911–1997) author and linguist
 Joseph Baldacchino (1894–1974) archaeologist
 Edward de Bono (1933–2021) creator, lateral thinking
 Joseph Buttigieg (1947–2019) literary scholar and translator
 George Mifsud Chircop (1951–2007) linguist
 Joe Friggieri (born 1946) professor of philosophy; poet
 Oliver Friggieri (born 1947) poet; novelist; literary critic
 Henry Frendo (born 1948) historian
 Gorg Mallia (born 1957) communications academic; author; cartoonist
 Suzanne Mizzi (1969–2011) – assistant principal, educator 
 Dominic Pace (1851–1907) theologian; philosopher
 Arvid Pardo (1914–1999) diplomat
 Eric Scerri (born 1953) author; historian; philosopher of chemistry; educator
 Peter Serracino Inglott (1936–2012) Roman Catholic priest; philosopher; former rector, University of Malta
 Stephen C. Spiteri (born 1963) military historian
 Anthony Valletta (1908–1988) – lepidopterist and educationalist
 Mikiel Anton Vassalli (1764–1829) promoter, Maltese language; compiler, first Maltese dictionary
 Themistocles Zammit (1864–1935) archaeologist; historian

Sports figures 
 Gilbert Agius (born 1974) football player
 Larry Attard (born 1951) jockey; inductee, Canadian Horse Racing Hall of Fame
 Sid C. Attard (born 1950) thoroughbred-horse trainer in Canada
 Etienne Barbara (born 1982) football player
 Carmel Busuttil (born 1964) football player
 Christian Brown (born 1989) amateur golfer & triathlete
 Charles Saliba (1929-1982) strongman
 Jamie Carragher (born 1978) football player of Maltese descent
 Andrew Chetcuti (born 1992) swimmer
 William Chetcuti (born 1985)  double trap
 Alex DeBrincat (born 1997)  ice hockey player 
 Samuel Deguara, (born 1991) basketball player
 Luke Dimech (born 1977) football player
 Tony Drago (born 1965) snooker player
 Ray Farrugia (born 1955) football coach
 Aaron Falzon (born 1996) basketball player
 Jeff Fenech (born 1964) boxer; former world champion
 Mario Fenech (born 1961) former rugby league footballer (South Sydney Rabbitohs)
 Xandru Grech (born 1974) athlete and coach 
 Charlie Magri (born 1956) boxer
 John Magri (born 1941) cyclist; participated in two Olympics
 David Millar (born 1977) racing cyclist
 Michael Mifsud (born 1981) football player
 Kevin Muscat (born 1973) former football player; head coach, Melbourne Victory FC
 Laurie Pace (born 1966) judo player; bronze medalist, 1990 Commonwealth Games
 André Schembri (born 1986) football player
 Nino Schembri (born 1974) martial artist
 Mikel Scicluna (1929–2010) professional wrestler; inductee, WWE Hall of Fame 
 Tony Tanti (born 1963) ice-hockey player
 Paul Tisdale (born 1973)  football coach
 Francesca Vincenti (born 1965) Windsurfing/Sailing/Hall of Fame
 Charlie Williams (born 1944) football player (Malta and the United States)

Others 
 Andrea Ashworth (born 1969) English author; of Italian-Maltese descent
 Peppi Azzopardi (born 1959) television presenter
 Ruth Baldacchino LGBT activist
 O. J. Borg (born 1979) English radio and television personality; of Maltese descent
 Angelik Caruana alleged Marian visionary
 Adelaide Conroy (fl 1871–1879), photographer
 Massimo Ellul (born 1970) businessman
 Maxim Gauci (1774–1854) lithographer
 Paul Gauci (19th century) lithographer; of Maltese descent
 Charlon Gouder, journalist 
 Karin Grech (1962–1978) letter bomb victim
 Mikiel'Ang Grima (1729–1798) surgeon
 Suzanne Mizzi (1967–2011) glamour model
 Alfred Pisani businessmen
 Tiffany Pisani (born 1992) fashion model
 Joe Sacco (born 1960) cartoonist
 Alex Vella (born 1954) businessman, boxer and outlaw motorcycle club leader
 Grandayy (born 1994) YouTuber, memer and music producer

See also

 List of people on stamps of Malta
 Lists of people by nationality

References